Martin Eli Segal (July 4, 1916 – August 5, 2012) was a Russian Empire-born American businessman who co-founded the Film Society of Lincoln Center in 1969 with two other Lincoln Center executives, William F. May and Schuyler G. Chapin. He also served as the Film Society's founding president and CEO until 1978. Segal was founding chair of the Commission for Cultural Affairs, the Cultural Assistance Center, and the New York International Festival of the Arts.

Segal was born in Vitebsk, Russian Empire (now located in present-day Belarus), in 1916 and immigrated to the United States. He is a former Associated Press columnist and founder of human resource and benefits consulting firm, The Segal Group, which he founded in October 1939. Segal served as the General Chairman of the Night of 100 Stars II on February 17, 1985, the first AIDS benefit held by the Actors' Fund of America.

The Martin E. Segal Theatre Center (MESTC), located at the CUNY Graduate Center in New York City, was renamed for Segal in March 1999. It was founded as the Center for Advanced Studies in Theatre Arts (CASTA) in 1979. He died at his Manhattan home in 2012. He was 96.

The Martin E. Segal Awards were established by Lincoln Center’s Board when Mr. Segal retired as Chairman in 1986. Marking the commitment of the late Mr. Segal to support rising artists, Lincoln Center’s 11 resident organizations nominate an artist annually for the distinguished prize, which gives financial assistance and recognition to young artists of exceptional accomplishment. Martin E. Segal Award recipients include:

Melissa Aldana
Tyler Angle
Paul Appleby
Jeff Balsmeyer
Inon Barnatan
Joan Barnhill
Alessio Bax
Alan Berliner
Sheldon Best
Jonathan Biss
Borromeo String Quartet
Brentano Quartet
Jason Robert Brown
Julia Bullock
Cast of Serafina
Anna Christy
Eric Cutler
The Daedalus String Quartet
Michelle DeYoung
Aaron Diehl
Meaghan Dutton-O’Hara
Nelsan Ellis
Escher String Quartet
Silas Farley
Ying Fang
Daire Fitzgerald
Shalita Grant
David Gresham
Andrea Gruber
Augustin Hadelich
Stefon Harris
Helen Huang
Michelle Hurst
JACK Quartet
Thomas Kail
Richard Kelley
Quinn Kelsey
Alec Knight
Claire Kretzschmar
Michael John LaChiusa
Kate Lindsey
Jon Magnussen
Miriam Mahdaviani
Nancy Maultsby
Reveka E. Mavrovitis
Jim McKay
Roberto Minczuk
Karen Notare
Matías Piñeiro
Laura Poitras
Jason Ritter
Valerian Ruminski
Mauricio Salgado
Jennie Somogyi
Scott St. John
Abi Stafford
Jonathan Stafford
Michael Stuhlbarg
Anita Thacher
Camille Thurman
Daniel Ulbricht
Erica vonKleist
Kenny Washington
Alisa Weilerstein
George Wellington
Christopher Wheeldon
Shai Wosner
Xian Zhang

References

External links
Martin E. Segal papers, 1929–2012 Manuscripts and Archives Division, The New York Public Library

1916 births
2012 deaths
American businesspeople
Emigrants from the Russian Empire to the United States
Belarusian Jews
American people of Belarusian-Jewish descent